"Golden Treasure" is a literary fairy tale by Danish poet and author Hans Christian Andersen (1805 – 1875).

Plot summary
There are children born with extraordinary qualities very definite, and this is the case of Peter, who has a great ability for music, especially for the drum. Using it in the war when he grows up, accompanying him in his heart when is in love and too when his reputation grows, it also lead to fame and wealth.

Short stories by Hans Christian Andersen
Danish fairy tales